"The Orange and Blue" is the traditional fight song of the Florida Gators intercollegiate sports teams of the University of Florida in Gainesville, Florida.

History of the lyrics and score 

The author of the lyrics and original music of "The Orange and Blue" is uncertain, but published examples of the University of Florida's songs and yells which include the lyrics date to at least the 1916–17 school year.  Sheet music for the song was published in 1925 which listed George Hamilton as the author.  Thornton W. Allen, a prolific compiler, composer and arranger of American university alma maters and college football fight songs, arranged a version of the musical score in 1935, with "Words by George Hamilton."  The present music for the song, as played at University of Florida events, was arranged by the university's former director of bands, Richard W. Bowles, in 1964.  Bowles served as the assistant university band director from 1958 to 1961, the director from 1961 to 1975, and continued to teach at the university until his retirement in 1985.

While "The Orange and Blue" is often played during football and basketball games and other Florida Gators athletic contests to rally fans and show support for the university's athletic teams, The Pride of the Sunshine marching band and the university's other pep bands rarely play any part of the song other than the chorus.

Lyrics 

So give a cheer for the Orange and Blue
Waving Forever!
Forever pride of Old Florida,
May she droop never.
We’ll sing a song for the flag today,
Cheer for the team at play!
On to the goal,
We’ll fight our way for
Flor-i-da!

Go Gators!

See also 

 The Pride of the Sunshine
 Florida Gators
 History of the University of Florida
 We Are the Boys from Old Florida

References

External links 
 Song recording
 UF bands private press vinyl releases

Florida Gators
American college songs
College fight songs in the United States
Southeastern Conference fight songs
University of Florida
Year of song unknown